Ceroxylon amazonicum is a species of palm tree. It is endemic to Ecuador. There are only four known populations. The species is threatened by deforestation.

References

amazonicum
Flora of the Amazon
Endemic flora of Ecuador
Endangered plants
Taxonomy articles created by Polbot